Björn Weikl (born 9 February 1977) is a German former professional footballer who played as a defender.

References

External links
 
 

1977 births
Living people
Footballers from Düsseldorf
German footballers
Association football defenders
2. Bundesliga players
3. Liga players
Regionalliga players
TuRU Düsseldorf players
Fortuna Düsseldorf II players
Fortuna Düsseldorf players
Sportfreunde Siegen players
Wuppertaler SV players
FC Triesenberg players
German expatriate footballers
German expatriate sportspeople in Liechtenstein
Expatriate footballers in Liechtenstein